German submarine U-560 was a Type VIIC U-boat of Nazi Germany's Kriegsmarine during World War II. She carried out no patrols, sank no ships, and was scuttled on 3 May 1945 in Kiel. The wreck was broken up in 1946. The submarine was laid down on 1 February 1940 at Blohm & Voss, Hamburg as yard number 536, launched on 10 January 1941 and commissioned on 6 March under the command of Oberleutnant zur See Hans-Jürgen Zetzsche. She served with the 24th U-boat Flotilla from 6 March 1941 for training and was reassigned to the 22nd flotilla on 1 December 1943, then the 31st flotilla on 1 March 1945.

Design
German Type VIIC submarines were preceded by the shorter Type VIIB submarines. U-560 had a displacement of  when at the surface and  while submerged. She had two shafts and two  propellers.

U-560 was fitted with five  torpedo tubes (four fitted at the bow and one at the stern), fourteen torpedoes, one  SK C/35 naval gun, 220 rounds, and a  C/30 anti-aircraft gun. The boat had a complement of between forty-four and sixty.

Service record
U-560 was scuttled on 3 May 1945, at Kiel, before participating in any war patrols. The wreck was later raised and broken up in 1946.

References

Bibliography

External links

German Type VIIC submarines
U-boats commissioned in 1941
1941 ships
Ships built in Hamburg
World War II submarines of Germany
Operation Regenbogen (U-boat)
Maritime incidents in May 1945